The 2016 Asia Rugby Women's Championship was from 7 – 28 May and held in Hong Kong and Japan. Kazakhstan withdrew from the competition leaving only Japan and Hong Kong. Japan were crowned champions.

Table

Results

Round 1

Round 2

References 

2016 in Asian rugby union
2016 in women's rugby union
Asia Rugby Women's Championship